The 1988–89 Soviet Championship League season was the 43rd season of the Soviet Championship League, the top level of ice hockey in the Soviet Union. 14 teams participated in the league, and CSKA Moscow won the championship.

First round

Final round

Relegation

External links
Season on hockeystars.ru

1988–89 in Soviet ice hockey
Soviet League seasons
Sov